Alexandra Marie Dolan is a journalist, weather presenter and science teacher who went undercover for the 2005 Channel 4 documentary Undercover Teacher. For this, she was suspended from teaching for one year by the General Teaching Council with the claim that she had 'breached student trust'. The decision has received criticism from both teachers and commentators.

Early life
Dolan was born in Cuckfield, in the Mid Sussex district of West Sussex. She has an older brother. After growing up in Cambridge she attended The Leys School, an independent school in Cambridge and Cambridge Centre for Sixth-form Studies, and studied Marine Biology at Newcastle University. In 2019, Dolan moved from Norwich to Cromer.

Career
Dolan presented the 2005 Channel 4 documentary Undercover Teacher. She was a presenter on Sky's Ocean TV programme Ocean Rescue in 2008. She returned to presenting the weather on BBC Look East on 5 January 2016 following maternity leave.

See also
 Jim Bacon (weather forecaster), fellow weather forecaster on Look East

References

External links
 Dispatches

Alumni of Newcastle University
BBC weather forecasters
British journalists
Schoolteachers from Sussex
British whistleblowers
British women journalists
Dispatches (TV programme)
Living people
People educated at The Leys School
People from Cambridge
People from Cuckfield
Television personalities from West Sussex
Year of birth missing (living people)